Aq Qaleh (also Romanized as Āq Qal‘eh) is a village in Kuhpayeh Rural District, Nowbaran District, Saveh County, Markazi Province, Iran. At the 2006 census, its population was 69, in 30 families.

References 

Populated places in Saveh County